The men's 50 metre rifle three positions team competition at the 2002 Asian Games in Busan, South Korea was held on 7 October at the Changwon International Shooting Range.

The rifle 3 positions consists of the kneeling, prone, and standing positions, fired in that order, with 3×40 shots. The caliber was .22 Long Rifle (5.6 mm).

Chinese team with Cai Yalin, Qiu Jian and Yao Ye won the gold medal after setting a new Asian record with 3472 points. The previous record was 3461 set seven years ago in Jakarta.

The host team South Korea (Cha Young-chul, Nam Hyung-jin and Park Bong-duk) finished second only two points behind China and won the silver medal.

Kazakhstan team (Sergey Belyayev, Vitaliy Dovgun and Yuriy Melsitov) won the bronze medal with the score of 3452, twelve points more than fourth placed team Kyrgyzstan. there were eleven teams in the competition with Uzbekistan, Malaysia, Thailand, Mongolia, India and Oman finished fifth to eleventh in that order.

Schedule
All times are Korea Standard Time (UTC+09:00)

Records

Results

References 

2002 Asian Games Report, Page 611–614
Results

External links
Official website

Men Rifle 50 3P T